San Andrés de Machaca Municipality is the fifth municipal section of the Ingavi Province in the  La Paz Department, Bolivia. Its seat is San Andrés de Machaca.

Division 
The municipality consists of the following 9 cantons:
 Chuncarcota de Machaca - 400 inhabitants (2001)
 Conchacollo de Machaca - 915 inhabitants
 Laquinamaya - 1.089 inhabitants
 Mauri - 616 inhabitants
 Nazacara - 494 inhabitants
 San Andrés de Machaca - 1.344 inhabitants
 Sombra Pata - 262 inhabitants
 Villa Artasivi de Machaca - 873 inhabitants
 Villa Pusuma Alto de Machaca - 317 inhabitants

The people 
The people are predominantly indigenous citizens of Aymara descent.

Places of interest 
Some of the tourist attractions of the municipality are:
 Afiani lagoon in San Andrés de Machaca Canton
 The chullpa of Kañoma in San Andrés de Machaca Canton
 The church of San Andrés de Machaca, built between 1806 and 1836

See also 
 Qullpa Jawira
 Thujsa Jawira
 Utani Apu

References

External links 
 San Andrés de Machaca Municipality: population data and map (Spanish) 

Municipalities of La Paz Department (Bolivia)